The Otto-von-Guericke University Magdeburg (Short: OVGU) was founded in 1993, making it one of the youngest universities in Germany. The university is located in Magdeburg, the Capital city of Saxony-Anhalt and has about 13,000 students in nine faculties. According to the Scopus database there are around 32,900 papers published in international journals from the University.

It was named after the physicist and former mayor of Magdeburg Otto von Guericke, famous for his experiments with the Magdeburg hemispheres.

The University had three forerunner institutions. These were the Technical University, the Pedagogical college and the Medical Academy, the first of which was established around 1953. They were amalgamated to the Otto-von-Guericke University in 1993.

Magdeburg

Magdeburg is the capital of the state of Saxony-Anhalt in Germany. It is a moderately-sized city located halfway between Hannover and Berlin. The city is crossed by the river Elbe on the banks of which the OVG university has its main structures. One advantage of staying and studying in Magdeburg is the simple and favourable living costs. Public transportation in Magdeburg is very advanced and free for the students of the university. A popular bar location for students is the Hasselbachplatz.

Faculties
 Faculty of Computer Science (FIN)
 Faculty of Economics and Management (FWW)
 Faculty of Humanities, Social Sciences and Education (FHW)
 Faculty of Mathematics (FMA)
 Faculty of Medicine (FME)
 Faculty of Natural Sciences (FNW)
 Faculty of Mechanical Engineering (FMB)
 Faculty of Process and Systems Engineering (FVST)
 Faculty of Electrical Engineering and Information Technology (FEIT)

IKUS
IKUS is an inter-cultural association for international students. It contributes to cultural synergies between the countries. Students actively participate in and celebrate cultural festivals frequently. A large number of foreign students organize the days for each country.

MIPS
MIPS (= Magdeburg International PhD Students) is the network for international PhD students at OvGU. This association helps to create and enhance the contact between international PhD students in order to promote the social and academic integration of young scientists. MIPS offers support and advice in various areas, e.g. to learn about Magdeburg and the German language, to give information about scholarships and job opportunities.

Studentenwerk Magdeburg
Studentenwerk Magdeburg is a student organization which provides a mensa (canteen) and dormitories for students. There are more than 10 dormitories near or on the university's campus.

Notable people
A sample of alumni and lecturers of the university includes:
Antje Buschschulte – swimming world champion and PhD biologist
Arno Ros – philosopher and former professor of theoretical philosophy at the university
Axel Ockenfels – professor for economics
Bernhard Sabel – psychologist who heads the Institute of Medical Psychology
Birgitta Wolff – economist, politician and former president of the Goethe University of Frankfurt
Claudia Maria Buch – economist, university teacher and currently Vice President of the Bundesbank
Dagmar Schipanski – physicist, university teacher and politician
Henning Scheich – professor for physiology at the medical faculty
Johannes Mallow – multiple winner of the World Memory Championships.
Nguyễn Thiện Nhân – Vietnam's former Deputy Prime Minister and Minister of Education and Training, who graduated with a doctorate in cybernetics
Rumiana Jeleva – former Minister of Foreign Affairs of Bulgaria, who earned a PhD in sociology

See also
 Journal of Automata, Languages and Combinatorics, an international academic journal in the field of theoretical computer science published by the university.
 Technische Mechanik, an international academic journal in the field of analytical, experimental and numerical mechanics is also published by the university.

Notes and references

External links

  
 Medical Faculty of the University Magdeburg 
 Inter-Cultural association for international students (IKUS) 
 Magdeburg International PhD Students (MIPS) 
 Student organization 

 
Buildings and structures in Magdeburg
Educational institutions established in 1993
1993 establishments in Germany
Universities and colleges in Saxony-Anhalt